Per Gundmann (30 January 1906 – 6 October 1967) was a Danish stage and film actor.

Filmography
Fem raske piger – 1933
Kidnapped – 1935
Week-End – 1935
Snushanerne – 1936
Frøken Møllers jubilæum – 1937
De tre, måske fire – 1939
I dag begynder livet – 1939
Frøken Vildkat – 1942
Mens sagføreren sover – 1945
Hatten er sat – 1947
En sømand går i land – 1954
Mennesker mødes og sød musik opstår i hjertet – 1967

External links

Danish male film actors
20th-century Danish male actors
Danish male stage actors
People from Ringsted Municipality
1906 births
1967 deaths